Ekers Raposo (born 3 March 1967) is a Dominican Republic judoka. He competed in the men's half-lightweight event at the 1992 Summer Olympics.

References

1967 births
Living people
Dominican Republic male judoka
Olympic judoka of the Dominican Republic
Judoka at the 1992 Summer Olympics
Place of birth missing (living people)